Kanhangad Ramachandran is an Indian Singer and Music Director from Kannur, Kerala. He was born to Shri. C. K Panicker bhagavathar, an exponent of Classical Music in the Carnatic tradition of South India, and Smt. Naniyamma.

He had started learning Carnatic Music at an early age and trained under the tutelage of his father, who was a Musician of North Malabar and a regular stage performer. Ramachandran grew up in an environment conducive to shape his musical interests.

He was considered as the prodigy of Music after performing at the Muneeswaran kovil, continuously for three hours, when he was nine years old. His performance earned him many admirers, and T. R. Mahalingam, a musician who had come there to perform, conferred his tampura to Ramachandran. Soon after the debut performance, he became one of the leading Carnatic vocalists.

He completed his schooling at Government High School, Cherukunnu and went to Nehru college, Kanhangad for higher studies. During those days he had won several competitions.

He made his debut as a Playback Singer after being invited by the music director K. V. Mahadevan to record a song for the Malayalam film 'Padmatheertham'. His playback debut song "kaarum karutha vaavum" was recorded when he was twenty. After the instant success in film industry, he began composing and singing more songs for movies such as 'Daliyapookkal', 'Shreeragam', 'Valayam', 'Pedithondan', 'Chuzhalikkaattu', 'Dhanayathra', 'Nilavariyathe', and 'Vellaram kannukal'.

Theyyam, one of the traditional art forms of Kerala, and he conserve this heritage by adapting the musical notations of the "thottam pattu" and its rhythm into his compositions. He has composed numerous devotional songs for renowned temples inside as well as outside Kerala.

Ramachandran became having a lot of students after the service as a music teacher around 30 years at Durga High school, Kanhangad. He is credited with light music compositions which had won several prizes in youth festivals.

Honours
Kanhangad Ramachandran has got opportunity to perform in a musical chamber conducted by Dr K. J. Yesudas in 1994 at Guruvayoor temple for religious harmony, and received a golden shawl as an honour from Yesudas.

He has received Kerala Sangeetha Nataka Akademi Award for Light Music in 1996.

He has given concert for 25 hours at Durga High school, Kanhangad for peace and national integration in 1997, and honoured with the title "Sangeetha rathnam" by minister N.K Balakrishnan."

He has won the Award for Best Singer in 1997 by singing" ini namukkidiminnalaayi pilarkkam" song for the drama 'Charithram Avasanikkunnilla' of Sangachethana, Kannur, in the Professional Drama Competition.

He was honoured with Baburaj Award by Kerala Moppila Sangeetha Academy in 2004 and subsequently he had been bestowed Chand Pasha Award in 2012 and Raveendran Award in 2013.

Mini Park, a cultural organization in Cherukunnu, has honoured Ramachandran is accordance with his reverent honor and homage paid to music for 50 years, in 2016. Ramachandran was presented with a Tampura and a golden shawl as an honour from Yesudas.

In 2017 he was entitled as "Sangeetha kulapathi" by Perumchallur Sangeetha sabha during the ceremony of awarding "Veerashrimkhala" by conferring "pattu and vala" from Raaja Rajeswara temple, Taliparamba.

He has conferred the title of Doctor of Letters (D Litt) by International Tamil University, U S A in 2017, for his excellence in Indian Music and innovative contribution to Carnatic Music as a playback singer and music director for the last five decades; the most grand achievement in his musical career.

Apart from these, he has received multiple honours such as, "Gandharva Gana puraskaaram", "Nava Kerala puraskaaram", and foremost "Ayiroor Sadasivan puraskaaram".

Dr.Kanhangad Ramachandran is a Top Rank graded artist of All India Radio, Calicut. He is very keen on encouraging people to take interest in Carnatic Music by means of his unconventional presentation style.

He has started and involved in many organizations on charities

He composed a song for Yesudas and also could sing with him. He has started a musical adoration for religious unity, at Kollur Mookambika temple in 2000 January 10, the birthday of Yesudas. It has been continued till now and has become a renowned chamber of Music performed by numerous vocalists under the leadership of Ramachandran.

He has been performing Carnatic concerts for a whole day, during Mahanavami celebration at Cherukunnu Annapoorneswari temple and Mamanikkunnu Bhagavathi temple.He has presented his concerts and ganamelas in more than 10,000 stages all over India and abroad. He has appeared as judge in various reality Music talent shows, and hosted a show titled "Bharatham", aired on Doordarshan channel.

Currently he is handling classes on instruments such as Violin, Veena, Tabla, Harmonium, Guitar, Keyboard, Flute, Jazz drum, Mridangam, apart from music, and running Vykhari Sangeetha Vidyalaya and Deekshith Recording studio at Cherukunnu, Kannur.

As a composer

As a singer

References

External links
 http://malayalasangeetham.info/php/createSongIndex.php?txt=Kanjangad%20Ramachandran&stype=singers&internal_mess=1&page_size=25&submit=Find+Songs

Malayalam film score composers
Malayalam playback singers
Living people
Indian male playback singers
People from Kannur district
20th-century Indian singers
20th-century Indian composers
Film musicians from Kerala
Indian male composers
Singers from Kerala
Male film score composers
20th-century Indian male singers
Year of birth missing (living people)
Recipients of the Kerala Sangeetha Nataka Akademi Award